Qatar Bolaghi (also Romanized as Qaţār Bolāghī; also known as Qaţār Bolāgh and Qātir Bulāq) is a village in Howmeh Rural District, in the Central District of Khodabandeh County, Zanjan Province, Iran. At the 2006 census, its population was 87, in 16 families.

References 

Populated places in Khodabandeh County